The 2018 Miami RedHawks football team represented Miami University in the 2018 NCAA Division I FBS football season. They were led by fifth-year head coach Chuck Martin and played their home games at Yager Stadium in Oxford, Ohio as members of the East Division of the Mid-American Conference. They finished the season 6–6, 6–2 in MAC play to finish in a tie for second place in the East division. Despite being bowl eligible, they were not invited to a bowl game.

Previous season
The RedHawks finished the 2017 season 5–7, 4–4 in MAC play to finish in a tie for third place in the East Division.

Preseason

Award watch lists
Listed in the order that they were released

Preseason media poll
The MAC released their preseason media poll on July 24, 2018, with the RedHawks predicted to finish in third place in the East Division.

Schedule

Source:

Game summaries

Marshall

vs. Cincinnati

at Minnesota

at Bowling Green

Western Michigan

at Akron

Kent State

at Army

at Buffalo

Ohio

at Northern Illinois

Ball State

13th game proposal
Miami was one of four bowl-eligible teams that did not receive a bowl game invitation. The university unsuccessfully attempted to schedule a 13th game with Louisiana-Monroe, which also did not go to a bowl.

References

Miami
Miami RedHawks football seasons
Miami RedHawks football